Viktory is an American Christian rapper, songwriter and record producer from Chicago, Illinois. He has released three studio albums and has appeared on the Billboard charts six times.

Career

Early life

Born and raised in Chicago, Illinois, and eventually moved to California, Viktory didn't grow up as a Christian. In fact, Viktory didn't become a Christian until his freshman year in college.

2008–2010: Believe It Now and The First of Many 

Viktory released his debut album, entitled Believe It Now, in 2008. The album featured recording artist Marvin Winans, Jr. and included the single Hold Me Down. In 2009, Viktory followed up the Believe It Now album with The First of Many, which never managed to reach the billboard charts.

2011–present: R4 (Relentless 4ever), Vol. 2 

Viktory went back in the studio and in 2011 saw his first taste of Billboard success with the release of his album Birth of a Legacy, Vol. 1 which charted 48 on the Top Christian album. The album was so successful that Viktory began receiving attention from competitive record companies to come join them. Viktory turned down the offers and remained independent. In 2012 Viktory released R4 (Relentless 4ever) which reached 22 on the billboard charts. In 2014 he followed R4 (Relentless 4ever) with R4 (Relentless 4ever), Vol. 2, which also reached number 12 on the billboard charts.

Awards and nominations

Stellar Awards

|-
|2012 Stellar Awards|2012
|Birth of a Legacy
|Rap, Hip Hop Gospel CD of the Year
|
|-

Discography

Studio albums

References

External links 
 http://r4ever.com/

Living people
American rappers
American performers of Christian music
Musicians from Illinois
Performers of Christian hip hop music
Rappers from Illinois
21st-century American rappers
Year of birth missing (living people)